The 2013 Open GDF Suez de Touraine was a professional tennis tournament played on indoor hard courts. It was the ninth edition of the tournament which was part of the 2013 ITF Women's Circuit, offering a total of $50,000 in prize money. It took place in Joué-lès-Tours, France, on 7–13 October 2013.

WTA entrants

Seeds 

 1 Rankings as of 30 September 2013

Other entrants 
The following players received wildcards into the singles main draw:
  Fiona Ferro
  Amandine Hesse
  Irina Ramialison
  Laura Thorpe

The following players received entry from the qualifying draw:
  Marta Domachowska
  Lesley Kerkhove
  Ana Konjuh
  Michaëlla Krajicek

The following player received entry by a Junior Exempt:
  Antonia Lottner

Champions

Singles 

  Mirjana Lučić-Baroni def.  An-Sophie Mestach 6–4, 6–2

Doubles 

  Julie Coin /  Ana Vrljić def.  Andrea Hlaváčková /  Michaëlla Krajicek 6–3, 4–6, [15–13]

External links 
 2013 Open GDF Suez de Touraine at ITFtennis.com
  

2013 ITF Women's Circuit
2013 in French tennis
Open de Touraine